Network engineering may refer to:

The field concerned with internetworking service requirements for switched telephone networks
The field concerned with Computer Networking; the design and management of computer networks
The field concerned with Telecommunications Engineering; developing telecommunications network topologies
The field concerned with Broadcasting; spreading messages to a dispersed audience electronically.

See also
Network administrator

Telecommunications engineering